Angela is a female given name. It is derived from the Greek word ángelos (ἄγγελος), meaning angel or "messenger of God".
In the United States, the name "Angela" was at its most popular between 1965 and 1979, when it was ranked among the top 10 names for girls. Between 1922 and 2021, in the United States, the name was ranked in the top 35 names for girls.

People 

 Angela of Foligno (1248–1309) Franciscan, Catholic, saint
 Angela Adamoli (born 1972), former Italian basketball player
 Angela Aki (born 1977), Japanese singer and songwriter
 Angela Allen, English paedophile convicted in the 2009 Plymouth child abuse case
 Angela Anderson, German artist
 Ángela Abós Ballarín (1934–2022), Spanish writer and politician
 Angela Barnes (born 1976), English stand-up comedian
 Angela Barry, Bermudian writer and educator
 Angela Bassett (born 1958), American actress
 Angela Myles Beeching, arts career specialist
 Angela Besharah (born 1977), Canadian actor and director
 Angela Bianchini (1921–2018), Italian writer and literary critic
 Angela Black, American news anchor
 Angela Bowie (born 1949), first wife of David Bowie, often known as "Angie Bowie"
 Angela Bradburn-Spangler (born 1968), American high jumper
 Angela Bray (born 1953), former British Member of Parliament
 Angela Warnick Buchdahl (born 1972), American rabbi
 Angela Buthelezi (born 1969), South African politician
 Angela Buxton (1934–2020), English tennis player 
 Angela Byars-Winston, professor of medicine
 Angela Bys (born 1989), American volleyball player
 Angela Camacho (born 1947), Colombian physicist
 Angela Cartwright (born 1952), English-born American actress
 Angela Chalmers (born 1963), Canadian athlete
 Angela Chang (born 1982), Taiwanese pop singer
 Angela Constance (born 1970), British politician
 Angela Cullen (born 1974), New Zealand physiotherapist and former field hockey player
 Angela Dale (born 1945) British statistician
 Angela Davis (born 1944), American political activist
 Angela Dean, British statistician
 Angela Delevingne, British socialite
 Angela DeMontigny, Indigenous Canadian fashion designer
 Angela Diederichsen (born 1950), German judge
 Angela Dimitriou (born 1954), Greek singer
 Angela Diniz (1944–1976), Brazilian socialite
 Angela von den Driesch (1934–2012), German archaeologist and veterinarian
 Angela Eagle (born 1961), British politician
 Angela Emuwa, Nigerian media executive and journalist
 Angela Essien, Nigerian technology entrepreneur
 Angela Fraleigh (born 1976), American artist
 Angela Gerekou (born 1959), Greek politician and actress
 Angela Gheorghiu (born 1965), Romanian opera diva
 Angela Ginovska (born 1993), Macedonian footballer
 Angela Gots, American actress
 Angela Griffin (born 1976), British actress and television presenter
 Angela Grippo, American neuroscientist and health psychologist
 Angela Gossow (born 1974), German death metal singer
 Ángela Gurría (1929–2023), Mexican sculptor
 Angela Hawken (born 1971), South African academic
 Angela de Jong (born 1976), Dutch journalist, television critic and columnist
 Angela Johnson (disambiguation), various people
 Angela Kalule, Ugandan musician and radio presenter
 Angela Karp, agricultural scientist
 Angela Kinsey (born 1971), American actress
 Angela Koehler, American biochemist
 Angela Kyerematen-Jimoh, Ghanaian business leader
 Ángela Labordeta (born 1967), Spanish writer and journalist
 Ângela Lago (1945–2017), Brazilian children's writer and illustrator
 Angela Lansbury (1925–2022), British-American actress and singer
 Angela Lanza (singer), American singer, known most for touring overseas for U.S. troops
 Angela Lee (born 1996), Canadian American martial artist
 Angela Lindvall (born 1979), American supermodel
 Angela Little (academic) (born 1949), British education and development academic
 Angela Little (actress) (born 1972), American model and actress
 Angela Marino (born 1986), New Zealand professional basketball player for the Adelaide Lightning (WNBL)
 Angela Mariotto, statistician 
 Angela Maurer (born 1975), German long-distance swimmer
 Angela McCormack (born 1996 or 1997), Australian journalist and radio presenter, known professionally as Ange McCormack
 Angela McGlowan (born 1970), American Republican political commentator, author, and consulting firm CEO
 Angela McGowan, Australian archaeologist
 Angela Meade (born 1977), opera singer
 Angela Melini (born 1969), Playboy Playmate for June 1992
 Angela Merici (1474–1540), Italian Catholic saint
 Angela Merkel (born 1954), German research scientist, Chancellor of Germany from 2005 to 2021
 Ángela Meyer (born 1947), Puerto Rican actress, comedian and producer of television and theatrical works
 Ángela Molina (born 1955), Spanish actress
 Angela Musiimenta, Ugandan scientist
 Angela Ndambuki (born 1980), Kenyan lawyer and corporate executive
 Angela von Nowakonski (1953–2020), Brazilian physician
 Angela Pan (born 1949), Hong Kong actress in films and soap operas
 Angela Palacious, (born 1953), Bahamian Christian minister
 Angela Peñaherrera (born 1985), Ecuadorian actress
 Angela Phillips, British journalist and academic
 Angela Pitt (born 1981), Canadian provincial politician from Alberta
 Angela Postma (born 1971), Dutch freestyle swimmer
 Angela Predhomme (born 1967), American singer-songwriter and music producer
 Angela Raiola (1960–2016), American reality television personality
 Angela Rayner (born 1980), British politician
 Angela Richards (born 1944), British actress and singer
 Angela Richardson (born 1974), British politician
 Angela Rippon (born 1944), English television journalist, newsreader, writer and presenter
 Angela Rumbold (1932–2010), former British Member of Parliament
 Angela Ruch (born 1983), American racing driver
 Angela Santomero (born 1968), American television producer, who is known for creating children's series such as Nick Jr.'s Blue's Clues
 Angela Seo, South Korean musician and member of Xiu Xiu born Hyunhye
 Angela Sidney (1902–1991), Tagish storyteller
 Angela Smith (squash) (born 1953), British champion squash player and pioneer of female sport
 Angela Smith (born 1961), Member of the British Parliament
 Angela Smith of Basildon (born 1959), British politician
 Ángela Téllez-Girón (1925–2015), Spanish noblewoman
 Angela Tong (born 1975), Hong Kong actress
 Ángela González Tort (1879–1946), Cuban guerrilla
 Ángela Valle (1927–2003), writer, journalist, essayist
 Angela Via (born 1981), American singer
 Angela Sarafyan (born 1983), American actress
 Angela Tiatia (born 1973), New Zealand-Australian artist of Samoan heritage
 Angela Veronese (1778–1847), Italian poet
 Angela Watkinson (born 1941), British politician
 Angela White, Australian porn star
 Angela Renée White (born 1988), American model and entrepreneur, known professionally as Blac Chyna
 Angela Yee (born 1976), American radio personality
 Angela Yeung (born 1989), Hong Kong Chinese model and actress, known professionally as Angelababy

Fictional characters
 Talking Angela, a female anthropomorphic white cat character featured in Outfit7 apps Talking Angela and My Talking Angela Angela, a character from Image Comics and Marvel Comics
 Angela, a character from netflix TV series Stranger Things, played by Elodie Grace Orkin.
 Angela Anaconda, a main cutout character from the Canadian animated television series Angela Anaconda Angela Channing, a fictional wine matriarch character from the television series Falcon Crest Angela Chase, a fictional character from the 1990s television series, My So-Called Life, played by a well-known actress Claire Danes
 Angela DuPre, a character from Margaret Peterson Haddix's book Found Angela Harris, a character from the British soap opera Coronation Street Angela Ledore, a character from the video game Professor Layton and the Miracle Mask Angela Li, a character from the MTV animated sitcom Daria Angela Martin, fictional accountant from the US television series The Office, played by Angela Kinsey
 Angela Montenegro, fictional character from the FOX drama Bones Angela Moss, a character from the television series Mr. Robot, played by Portia Doubleday
 Angela Orosco, a character from the Silent Hill video game series
 Angela Smith, a character from the children's animated supernatural television series Mona the Vampire Angela Weber, a character from the book and film series The Twilight Saga Angela Ziegler, a support-class character from the video game Overwatch''
 Angela, a character from the adult animated series "Family Guy"

See also
 Angela (disambiguation), for other than human-name usages
 Angie (disambiguation)
 Anđela (given name), Serbian version of Angela

References

Feminine given names
English feminine given names
Romanian feminine given names